Voutyro is a small village located 6 kilometers south-west of Karpenisi, the capital of Evrytania, Greece. Voutyro is known by UNESCO as one of the five most environmentally clean areas in the world.

Voutyro is a traditional village of about 150 residents, part of the municipal unit of Karpenisi. The village is verdurous with fountains of spring mountain water. Here can also be found the biggest stone church of the Byzantine style of the prefecture, Agia Paraskevi. Adventures such as whitewater rafting, trekking, kayaking, hiking, camping, rappelling and more can be found near the village of Voutyro for tourists and locals alike. Near Voutyro is the Panta Vrehei Gorge, which is a little difficult to access.

Populated places in Evrytania